Hugh Gallagher (October 17, 1932 – July 13, 2004) was an author and international disability advocate.  Born in Palo Alto, California, he grew up in Chicago, New York City and Washington, D.C.

He contracted polio in 1952 at age 19 while studying at Haverford College. He drafted the Architectural Barriers Act of 1968, which required that buildings built with federal funds be made accessible to all; it eventually was enacted into law. In 1956, he graduated from what is now Claremont McKenna College in California and then went on a Marshall scholarship to Oxford University, where he received the equivalent {August 12, 1956, https://www.utoledo.edu/library/canaday/findingaids1/MSS-185.pdf} of a master's degree in political science, philosophy and economics. Bob Dole wrote, "Hugh's most outstanding contribution to the quality of life of people with disabilities was to successfully place disability on the agenda of the Congress for the first time." 

The Hugh Gallagher Award was created by Peter Kovler to commemorate Gallagher, who used his writing to educate the public about injustices, to promote understanding among diverse populations and to draw people into the choice-in-dying movement. The Award is given annually by Compassion & Choices. {https://issuu.com/faircountmedia/docs/ada25_complete_book/s/144842}

Death
Gallagher, who wrote from his home in Cabin John, Maryland, died of cancer in Washington, D.C. on July 13, 2004, aged 71.

Awards
 Henry B. Betts Award for work on behalf of disabled people. {https://www.sfsu.edu/~news/2005/spring/26.htm "Henry B. Betts Award... won by... Hugh Gallagher..."}

Books

 Advise and Obstruct: The Role of the United States Senate in Foreign Policy Decisions (1969)
 Etok: A Story of Eskimo Power,1974
 FDR's Splendid Deception, 1985
 By Trust Betrayed: Patients, Physicians and the License to Kill in the Third Reich, 1990
 Errant Thoughts, Curious Names, Hackneyed Rhymes: A Commonplace Book, 1994
 Black Bird Fly Away: Disabled in an Able-Bodied World, 1998

External links
 Obituary, inclusiondaily.com, July 15, 2004.
 Profile of Hugh Gallagher at newmobility.com

1933 births
2004 deaths
Writers from Maryland
American disability rights activists
People with polio
Claremont McKenna College alumni
Deaths from cancer in Washington, D.C.